The Automobile Racing Club of America (ARCA) is an auto racing sanctioning body in the United States, founded in 1953 by John Marcum. The current president of ARCA is Ron Drager, who took over the position in 1996 following the death of Bob Loga. The ARCA Menards Series races stock cars similar to those seen in past years in the NASCAR Cup Series, and indeed most cars used in the Menards Series were previously used in NASCAR. ARCA's competitors contain a mix of both professional racers and hobby racers alike, in addition to younger competitors trying to make a name for themselves, sometimes driving as part of a driver development program for a NASCAR team.  ARCA Menards Series races are broadcast on Fox Sports 1, Fox Sports 2 or MAVTV, and they have been previously broadcast on ESPN, ESPN2, USA Network, TNN, Prime Network, CBS Sports Network, NBCSN, TBS and TNT.

ARCA owns both the Toledo Speedway and Flat Rock Speedway. ARCA formerly sanctioned the ARCA Midget Series from 1988 until 2002 and a truck-racing series called the ARCA Lincoln Welders Truck Series from 1999 to 2016.

History
John Marcum founded the Midwest Association for Race Cars (MARC) in 1953 as a regional stock car racing series after working as an official for NASCAR founder Bill France Sr. In 1964, the name was changed to the "Automobile Racing Club of America" when the series became national by racing on superspeedways. This ARCA is not to be confused with the organization founded in 1933 with the same name. ARCA started racing at Daytona International Speedway in 1964, during the Daytona Speedweeks, at the request of Bill France Sr., who had raced against Marcum in the 1940s.

The ARCA/NASCAR relationship continues today. The series frequently schedule events at the same track on the same weekend. The ARCA event is frequently the Saturday support race to the Sunday NASCAR Cup event. For several decades, ARCA used older NASCAR Cup race cars at their events, and with the advent of the Car of Tomorrow, teams were able to sell off their older cars to ARCA teams; current NASCAR Cup driver Joey Logano drove in ARCA in 2008, driving veteran NASCAR Cup cars after the Cup move to the COT.

On April 27, 2018, NASCAR acquired ARCA.

In 2019, it was announced that the NASCAR K&N Series East and West would be moved under the ARCA banner as the ARCA Menards Series East and ARCA Menards Series West for 2020. 

Former NASCAR drivers, such as Benny Parsons, Kyle Petty (who won the 1979 Daytona ARCA 200, the first race he ever competed in), Ken Schrader and others, have competed in and advanced through the ARCA series on the way to successful NASCAR careers. ARCA has been used throughout its history as a stepping stone for hopeful NASCAR drivers.

Points scoring system
ARCA uses a relatively simple point system to determine champions. 

Note: 
 Every finishing position between 1st and 40th is separated by five points, with the winning driver receiving 200 points and the 40th place driver receiving five points.  Any driver who finishes behind 40th will receive five points.  
 Points are also awarded for qualifying, with: 15 points awarded to the pole position, 10 points for the second fastest qualifier, and five for the third fastest qualifier.
 Any driver who leads an official lap will receive five bonus points.  
 The driver who leads the most official laps will receive an additional five points.  
 All drivers who pre-enter and compete in a race will receive an additional 25 points.  
 Any driver who enters and competes in each pre-designated five race leg of the overall schedule will receive an additional 100 points.

Series 
 ARCA Menards Series
 ARCA Menards Series East
 ARCA Menards Series West
 ARCA Midwest Tour
ARCA West Mac's Series
ARCA West Circle K 
 ARCA Late Model Gold Cup Series
 ARCA OK Tire Sportsman Series
 CRA Super Series

Former series
 ARCA Lincoln Welders Truck Series

Gallery

References

External links
Official ARCA Website
ARCA RE/MAX Series Sim Racing
The Pit Lane - ARCA Racing News
The ARCA Results Archive

See also

 United States Auto Club
 Sports Car Club of America
 Automobile Association of America
 Automobile Club of America

 
Auto racing organizations in the United States
Companies based in Toledo, Ohio
Organizations established in 1953
Sports governing bodies in the United States
Sports in the Southern United States
Sports leagues in the United States
Stock car racing
NASCAR